Bradshaw International is an American manufacturer of food service equipment, headquartered in Rancho Cucamonga, California. The company owns the brand goodcook and has a partnership with Mr. Clean.

History
The company was founded in 1969.

In 2004, the brand "captured 43% of the nationwide market for kitchen ware sold at supermarkets and drug stores - inventory for all of which will pass through the headquarters complex when the operation is at 100 percent by the end of March". The brand is sold at "Albertsons, Food 4 Less, Gelsons, Harman's, Kitchen Collection, Raley's, Safeway, Sav-on Drug, Stater Brothers and Vons".

In 2005, the company introduced "new can opener called the goodcook Orbi Safecut Can Opener".

In February 2011, Top Chef star, Fabio Viviani, formed a partnership with the company's moka division, Bialetti. Bradshaw hoped Viviani would bring "appeal to their newest products [that] year.

In 2012, Arbor Investments sold Bradshaw International to ONCAP.

In 2018, the company released "GoodCook Meal Prep Containers".

In March 2021, Bradshaw Home acquired a company named Architec Housewares.

In October 2021, ONCAP has completed the sale Bradshaw Home to Arbor Investments.

References

External links

Manufacturing companies established in 1969
Home appliance manufacturers of the United States
American companies established in 1969